Brătuleni is a commune in Nisporeni District, Moldova. It is composed of two villages, Brătuleni and Cîrnești.

References

Communes of Nisporeni District